Zhongxing New Village, sometimes rendered as Chunghsing New Village is an urban village located in Nantou City, Nantou County, Taiwan (ROC) and was until 2018, when the Taiwan Provincial Government was abolished, was the seat of government of Taiwan Province. The term zhōngxīng is from a Chinese legend, referring to the restoration of the Xia Dynasty by king Shao Kang, an allusion to the ROC government taking back mainland China.

It is a planned town with a population of 25,549 as of February 2010. With all the buildings owned by the government, development is strictly controlled and carefully planned.

History
Taipei, the temporary capital and the seat of government of the Republic of China (Taiwan), was also the capital of Taiwan Province from September 1945 until 1956. Ground was broken on the village on 4 November 1955, and branches of the government began moving on 5 July 1956. The provincial government held its first meeting at Zhongxing New Village on 27 November 1957, and the provincial administration building began use on 1 July 1957.

The People's Republic of China (PRC), which has ruled the Chinese mainland since 1949, who also claimed the island of Taiwan, does not recognize the move of the provincial government from Taipei to Zhongxing New Village as legitimate. Thus, the PRC publishes Taipei as the claimed provincial capital on its official maps.

Research development
There are plans for an industrial innovation park to be set up in the planned zone in the city; domestic research institutes have been invited to open innovation and incubation centers there. In addition, a market intelligence technology center is also planned for the development of green intelligence mobile technologies through cloud computing.

The park is scheduled to begin construction after the completion of an environmental impact assessment in 2011. It is estimated to cost NT$10.7 billion (US$367.5 million) to construct, and will house 250 research and development units and provide 13,000 new jobs. No manufacturing activities will be conducted at the park, which will instead focus on emerging and advanced industrial technology.

See also
 Liming New Village
 Taiwan Provincial Government

References

External links

 Population

Populated places in Nantou County
New towns started in the 1950s
Military dependents' village, Taiwan
Provincial capitals in China